is one of 9 wards of Kobe, Japan. It has an area of 241.84 km², and a population of 226,402 (2008). Kita in Japanese means North. Kita-ku is the biggest ward which occupies the northeastern part of the city. Arima Onsen is located in Kita-ku.

Points of interest 
 Kobe Municipal Arboretum

External links 

 Kita-ku official website 

Wards of Kobe